Fulgentius is a Latin male given name which means "bright, brilliant". It may refer to:
Fabius Planciades Fulgentius (5th–6th century), Latin grammarian
Saint Fulgentius of Ruspe (5th–6th century), bishop of Ruspe, North Africa, possibly related to the above; some authorities believe them to be the same person
Fulgentius Ferrandus (6th century), deacon of Carthage, Fulgentius of Ruspe's pupil and biographer
Saint Fulgentius of Cartagena (6th–7th century), bishop of Écija, Hispania
Gottschalk of Orbais, nicknamed Fulgentius (9th century), monk, theologian and poet

See also 
Fulgencio